Omar Miles Gooding Sr. (born October 19, 1976), also known by his stage name Big O, is an American actor.

Early life and education
Omar Gooding was born in Los Angeles, California, on October 19, 1976, to Shirley (née Sullivan) and Cuba Gooding Sr., the former lead singer for The Main Ingredient. His older brother is Academy Award-winning actor Cuba Gooding Jr.

Omar graduated from North Hollywood High School in 1994.

Career
Gooding is best known for appearing in television shows, such as Touched by an Angel, Wild & Crazy Kids, Hangin' with Mr. Cooper, Smart Guy,  and Playmakers, and also the films Ghost Dad and Baby Boy for which he received critical praise for his role as "Sweetpea".  He was one of the original hosts of the Nickelodeon television show Wild & Crazy Kids from 1990 to 1992. Gooding played D.H., a running back, on Playmakers in 2003. He played the character Odell in the third season of Deadwood. In 2005, he took the role of Calvin Palmer Jr. in the television series Barbershop (in the role originated by Ice Cube in the film version), based upon the 2002 film of the same name. Coincidentally, he also appeared on the UPN sitcom One on One as a barber in Flex Washington's barbershop. Gooding also appeared in the Grey's Anatomy episode "Superfreak".

From April 2010 to July 2010, Gooding starred as trauma charge nurse, Tuck Brody, in the Bruckheimer television series Miami Medical.

In 2012, he premiered and starred in the first season of Family Time, a television series for the Bounce TV network that is also shown on TV One. This is another show created by Bentley Kyle Evans. Gooding plays a comedic father name Anthony Stallworth, alongside Angell Conwell, who plays Mrs. Stallworth. Currently, the series is in its fifth season.

Gooding played a main role as Carter in the film Percentage. He released a hip hop album titled The Excuse in 2019.

It was announced on November 30, 2021, that Gooding will play Cal Johnson in the upcoming Disney Channel original series, Saturdays.

Filmography

Film

Television

Guest appearances

References

External links
 
 Interview with Omar Gooding about his rapping career
 Omar "BigO" Gooding MySpace, Photos, HipHop tracks, 
 Omar Gooding Twitter account

1976 births
American male comedians
Living people
American male film actors
American male television actors
African-American male actors
University High School (Los Angeles) alumni
Male actors from Los Angeles
20th-century American male actors
21st-century American male actors
Comedians from California
American people of Barbadian descent
20th-century American comedians
21st-century American comedians
North Hollywood High School alumni
20th-century African-American people
21st-century African-American people